Ousmane Dieng (born 21 May 2003) is a French professional basketball player for the Oklahoma City Thunder of the National Basketball Association (NBA).

Early life and youth career
Dieng grew up in Lot-et-Garonne, where his father, Ababacar, played basketball. At the youth level, he played for Villeneuve Basket Club and JSA Bordeaux. Dieng attended INSEP in Paris. He competed for its under-18 team at the Next Generation Tournament.

Professional career

Centre Fédéral (2020–2021)
In the 2020–21 season, Dieng averaged 12.6 points, 5.8 rebounds, and 2.9 assists per game for Centre Fédéral in the Nationale Masculine 1.

New Zealand Breakers (2021–2022)
On 1 June 2021, Dieng announced that he would play for the New Zealand Breakers of the National Basketball League (NBL) in the 2021–22 season, alongside fellow Frenchman and eventual 2022 NBA draft selection Hugo Besson. He became the first European player to join the league's Next Stars program to develop NBA draft prospects. Dieng had also been recruited by major college basketball programs and the NBA G League Ignite. Dieng left the Breakers on 17 April 2022 in order to prepare for the 2022 NBA draft.

Oklahoma City Thunder (2022–present)
Dieng was selected with the eleventh overall pick by the New York Knicks in the 2022 NBA draft, and was then immediately traded to the Oklahoma City Thunder in exchange for three 2023 first-round picks.

National team career
Dieng represented France at the 2019 FIBA U16 European Championship in Italy. He averaged 8.9 points, 3.6 assists and 2.7 rebounds per game, helping his team win the silver medal.

References

External links
NBL profile

2003 births
Living people
Centre Fédéral de Basket-ball players
Expatriate basketball people in New Zealand
French expatriate basketball people in the United States
French expatriate sportspeople in New Zealand
French men's basketball players
National Basketball Association players from France
New Zealand Breakers players
New York Knicks draft picks
Oklahoma City Blue players
Oklahoma City Thunder players
Shooting guards
Small forwards
Sportspeople from Lot-et-Garonne